This article discusses Christian politics in New Zealand.

The monarch of New Zealand, who is New Zealand's head of state, is also the Supreme Governor of the Church of England. But the country itself, unlike the United Kingdom, has no official or established religion, and freedom of religion has been protected since the signing of the Treaty of Waitangi. As of the 2018 census, 37% of New Zealanders were affiliated with a Christian religion of some denomination, compared with 48% who had no religion, 9% who followed another religion, and 7% who objected to answering. There are a range of views on the extent to which Christianity affects New Zealand politics.

During the nineteenth century, many church-oriented bodies sponsored and fostered several of the original European settlement-ventures in the period 1840–1850, notably the settlements of Otago (1848, Free Church of Scotland) and Canterbury (1850, Church of England) – and many evangelicals, fundamentalists and conservative Catholics see Christianity as underlying New Zealand's entire political system.

On the other hand, a notable politician of the late 19th century, Sir Robert Stout, had a considerable reputation as a freethinker and many dismiss the effects of Christianity, saying that New Zealand society has always had a largely secular character.

Christianity has never had an explicit role in the major  political parties, and the religious elements in these parties have taken varying forms, and cannot easily be classified as a single movement.

Māori Christianity, particularly the Rātana movement has often been of importance, with an historic alliance between it and the Labour Party signed in 1936, and many other parties now vying for their support, but this is generally regarded as a political rather than religious matter.

In the 1990s a series of Christian political parties such as Christian Heritage, the Christian Democrats, the Christian Coalition and Destiny New Zealand arose out of a Christian conservative strand in the 1970s and 1980s, mostly in reaction to a perceived decline of social standards; but none reached 5% of the vote in any election. To date, the same has been true of the New Conservative Party, One Party and Vision New Zealand, their contemporary successors in the 2020s.

Before the 1970s: debates over prohibition and capital punishment 

Before the establishment of major specifically Christian parties in the 1970s, evangelical or fundamentalist Christianity had had little specific effect on mainstream New Zealand politics in society. While the Baptist Union endeavoured to get alcohol-prohibition policies passed in the late nineteenth and early twentieth centuries, the Catholic Church urged its members to vote against such laws, concerned that the measures would outlaw wine for the Eucharist. A referendum on prohibition took place in 1919, but the return of demobilised New Zealand soldiers from World War I defeated the measure. Evangelical and Catholic New Zealanders did not respond as corporate institutions to the debates on capital punishment in New Zealand in the thirties, forties and fifties, but individual laypeople and clergy did make their opposition heard. The Anglican Church of New Zealand became more forthright in its opposition to the death penalty, and as the largest Christian denomination in New Zealand, it made its presence felt.

Christianity within mainstream political parties 
Neither the Labour Party nor the National Party, the two traditional dominant mainstream political parties in New Zealand since the 1930s, represent explicitly religious traditions. Nevertheless, both parties have occasionally contained people who saw their political mission in religious terms. A number of early politicians, both in Labour and in National, saw their respective political ideologies as an extension of "Christian values".

In the early Labour Party a significant sub-set of the party promoted what one might call "Christian socialism",  New Zealand's first Labour Prime Minister Michael Joseph Savage is said to have personified Labour's "Applied Christianity." Labour won an overwhelming victory by presenting itself as the party of practical Christian compassion, in contrast to the "anti-family" depression-era coalition government. It was in this context that Savage – who would later return to his Roman Catholic roots – described Labour's Social Security Act (1938), intended to afford security for all New Zealanders 'from cradle to grave', as ‘applied Christianity’.

A number of early Labour politicians had Christian backgrounds. One of the first leaders of the Labour Party, HE Holland (1919–1933), had been a street preacher with the Salvation Army in Australia prior to his migration to New Zealand. Savage's successor, Peter Fraser (1940–49), reflected in his personal life on the lasting impact of his Scottish Presbyterian upbringing, and the next leader, Walter Nash, was "an avowed Christian strongly committed to the Anglican Church." Subsequent Labour Party leaders also had church backgrounds. Arnold Nordmeyer, the leader of the Labour Party in opposition from 1963 to 1965, was an ordained Presbyterian minister. David Lange, (Prime Minister 1984–1989) was Methodist, while Norman Kirk (Prime Minister 1972–74) was raised by devout members of The Salvation Army.

Such church connections are also present in the National Party. For example, Keith Holyoake (Prime Minister 1957, 1960–72), was "brought up in a strict Open Brethren environment", and in later years was an irregular attender of the Presbyterian church. John Marshall (deputy Prime Minister 1957, 1960–72; Prime Minister 1972) was active in the Presbyterian church, while Robert Muldoon (Prime Minister 1975–84) was raised as a Baptist and continued as a church member until he married and became an Anglican like his wife Thea.

The National Party, the ostensibly more socially conservative of the two "major" traditional parties, apparently received increasing proportional support from religiously identifiable voters between 2002 and 2005.

Also, the Rātana movement has some influence in New Zealand politics (see Māori Christianity, below).

In , however, religion has not usually formed a major component of either Labour or National platforms - and three of the last four prime ministers have described themselves as agnostic. Christopher Luxon, the opposition leader since 2021, is described as Evangelical. Michael Wood, transport minister in the sixth Labour Government, is a practising Anglican.

Evangelical political activism: anti-abortion activism in the 1970s 
Beginning in the 1970s a significant increase in activism by New Zealand evangelical and conservative Catholic-based organisations occurred. Much of this opposed reforms undertaken by governments. In the 1970s and 1980s, two significant campaigns opposed the liberalisation of abortion-rules and the legalisation of homosexual acts. Perhaps surprisingly, members of the generally conservative National Party (George Gair and Venn Young, respectively) championed each of these legislative measures. Organizations such as the Society for the Protection of the Unborn Child (now Voice for Life) and the Society for the Promotion of Community Standards (SPCS) served as a focus for Christian conservatism. Eventually, the conservatives won their initial battles against homosexual law reform, but lost their ongoing battle over abortion during the late seventies and early eighties. For more about the history of the New Zealand abortion-debate, see abortion in New Zealand.

Liberal Protestant activism: 1981–2001
Mainline Protestant churches became involved with ending sporting contacts with South Africa during the apartheid era (c. 1948–1994), culminating when many liberal Protestants and Catholics participated in mass protests against the New Zealand Rugby Football Union's 1981 Springbok Tour of New Zealand. Shortly afterward, many of the same liberal Christians participated in the peace movement of the 1980s, which resulted in New Zealand becoming a declared nuclear free zone in 1987. During the New Zealand National Party governments of the 1990s, these liberal Christians became involved in organising against New Right cutbacks to social-welfare benefits (cutbacks supported by the New Zealand Business Roundtable, ACT New Zealand and similar organisations).

Evangelical political activism: 1980s: Moral Activism
By the early 1980s, the Christian evangelical revival of the 1960s had developed into a social movement that utilized community and political action in response to "moral" issues. These developments were influenced by the emergence of a vocal Christian Right in the Reagan-era United States, represented by figures such as Jerry Falwell and Pat Robertson and groups such as the Moral Majority and Christian Coalition. As with their American counterparts, these conservative evangelicals opposed homosexuality, abortion, feminism, sex education, and supported traditional family and moral values. Opposition by conservative elements within mainstream denominations towards a perceived "liberal trend" led to a decline in church membership by 7 percent between 1976 and 1981. By contrast, church membership at more conservative denominations like the Pentecostal churches rose by 127 percent during that period.

In March 1985, Labour's Fran Wilde introduced a new homosexual law reform bill. This became a moral issue for New Zealand religious conservatives to rally against. Two National member of parliaments, Graeme Lee and Norman Jones, organised a petition against the bill; and three Labour MPs Geoff Braybrooke, Whetu Tirikatene-Sullivan, and Allan Wallbank supported their campaign. A number of activists from the United States provided advice. At about the same time, the Coalition of Concerned Citizens (CCC) formed, using the motto "For God, Family and Country", while many liberal Anglicans and Methodists formed a "Christians for Homosexual Law Reform" network to counter their efforts. The campaign against homosexual law reform eventually failed, however, and the bill became law in 1986.

Like their American counterparts, conservative evangelical movements in New Zealand also tended to be strongly anti-Communist. One such activist Barbara Faithfull, founder of the pressure group CREDO, alleged that Soviet Communists were using sex education, abortion, and homosexuality to undermine the "moral fabric" of Western civilization. Some conservative evangelical elements like Faithfull and the Coalition of Concerned Citizens also joined forces with other right-wing groups in alleging that there was a conspiracy by Communist groups like the pro-Moscow Socialist Unity Party (SUP) to infiltrate the Labour Party, the trade unions, and exploit various popular issues like the anti-Springbok tour protests, the Māori biculturalism, and the anti-nuclear movement. In response to perceived Communist influence within these popular causes, some conservative Christian elements like the CCC and former–Communist–turned–right-wing pundit Geoff McDonald supported maintaining ties with South Africa and preserving the ANZUS security alliance with the United States and Australia.

The CCC and another evangelical advocacy group the Concerned Parents Association (CPA) also criticized the introduction of Māori biculturalism and multiculturalism into the education system as 'anti-Christian' for allegedly promoting alternative religious beliefs. The CPA and Geoff McDonald also criticized the National Council of Churches in NZ for allegedly creating a sense of guilt among White New Zealanders by highlighting historic issues like Maori land confiscations during the New Zealand Wars. Several conservative evangelical periodicals like Coalition Courier, Family Alert and Challenge Weekly were used to disseminate these ideas.

During the 1987 general election, conservative Christian elements including the Society for the Protection of Unborn Children (SPUC), Women for Life and the Coalition of Concerned Citizens tried to infiltrate the National Party by running conservative Christian individuals as candidates. Conservative Christian groups and periodicals like the Coalition Courier and Challenge Weekly also attacked the Labour government's policies towards peace education, sex education, abortion, and Maori biculturalism. However, they met little success in this effort and the National Party leadership responded by quietly centralizing its candidate selection procedures. Increased evangelical political activism did, however, set the stage for the emergence of several evangelical Christian political parties during the next twenty-five years (see below).

Evangelical parties
A number of New Zealand evangelical Christian political parties emerged in  times:
Christian Heritage Party (1989–2006)
Christian Democrat Party (1995–1998)
Destiny New Zealand (2007–10)
Family Party (2007–10)
Vision New Zealand (2019–) (initially to be Coalition NZ)

Before the Christian Coalition 
Many members of the Reformed Churches of New Zealand became involved in founding the Christian Heritage Party, and a model had existed in the Netherlands since 1922, the Political Reformed Party or SGP (Dutch). As Dirk Vanderpyl noted in his denominational history of the Reformed Churches, Trust and Obey (1994), the SGP, ChristenUnie and other Reformed fundamentalist-based political parties were involved in "testimonial party" politics within the Dutch Parliament, based more on principle than concrete political objectives.

The Christian Heritage Party formed in 1989. The driving force behind its creation, Bill van Rij, had had previous involvement in the Coalition of Concerned Citizens. Van Rij took direct inspiration from the Christian Heritage Party of Canada, and believed that a similar party could have success in New Zealand. In January 1988, van Rij and several friends established a steering committee for a new political party based on the Canadian model. In February, a meeting in Christchurch confirmed the plan, and John Allen, a former National Party candidate, became de facto interim leader. By 20 July 1989, a sufficient number of people had gathered for the party to launch officially. The party took a strict biblical line, and strongly condemned things such as abortion, pornography, and the perceived erosion of marriage and the family. Shortly after the party's official launch, the Reverend Graham Capill gained appointment as leader, a position he would hold for the next fourteen years.

Religious conservatives gave a mixed reaction to the formation of the Christian Heritage Party. Some groups, such as SPUC, welcomed the party. Others, however, believed that an independent Christian conservative party would not succeed, or worse, would split the conservative vote. Graeme Lee, a National member of parliament who had fought against homosexual law-reform, did not support the new party, seeing fighting for Christian values within the National Party as more effective.

One controversial issue associated with the Christian Heritage Party centred on the party's rigidly "confessional" nature. Under this policy, all members of the party had to declare themselves as Christians. The Christian Heritage Party saw this requirement as only natural, and as a guarantee of the party's ideological purity. Other Christian activists, however, particularly those with more moderate views, believed that confessionalism unnecessarily restricted the support base of the party. Instead, they advocated a party "based on Christian values", rather than a "Christians only" party. The non-confessionalists claimed that anyone, even if not followers of the Christian religion, could see the benefits of Christian values to society.

As for the Christian Democrats, they had a relatively broader base. In New Zealand, the New Life Churches (some of which were then known as "New Life Centres") had a history of recent anti-abortion, anti-feminist and anti-gay activism, particularly in Christchurch, from the mid-seventies onward. Like Lee, many had joined the National Party, only to become disillusioned as it rejected social conservatism in favour of a more pluralist model as it sought to reach out to urban liberals. Brett Knowles documented and analysed the New Life Churches and their denominational history in 1999.

Graeme Lee, the National MP, opposed confessionalism, believing that a party which followed this doctrine would never gain sufficient support. For this reason, among others, Lee, when invited, refused to join the new Christian Heritage Party. Lee had disliked the idea of having a separate Christian or Christian-based party at all, believing that remaining with National could prove more effective. In 1993, however, Lee had fallen out with the National Party's leadership, mainly due to losing his ministerial role in a Cabinet reshuffle. Lee's demotion, combined with his belief that National had started to become gradually more and more liberal, had prompted him to plan a departure. At this point Christian Heritage contacted Lee and invited him to join the party. According to some accounts, Lee actually received an offer of leadership.

The negotiations between Lee and Christian Heritage eventually broke down, however. The issue of confessionalism, which Lee continued to oppose, remained a major sticking-point. Lee eventually pulled out of the talks, and in 1994, established his own group, known as the United Progressive Party. The prospect of two competing Christian parties alarmed many Christian conservative activists, and repeated attempts took place to get the two sides talking once again, but the issue of confessionalism (as well as several other policy differences that had emerged) made this difficult. In November, however, talks re-opened, partly at the urging of Bill van Rij.

It seemed obvious to both sides that co-operation would bring mutual benefits — Lee had the advantage of a current Parliamentary seat, while the Christian Heritage Party had the advantage of superior organisation and a "grass-roots" network. Policy-issues once again proved difficult, but on 20 December 1994 a proposed agreement finally emerged. The proposal, which needed ratification by both Christian Heritage and the United Progressives, would have seen both parties dissolved, with a new united, non-confessional party set up in their place. Lee reportedly endorsed the plan, and believed that it would succeed. Graham Capill, of Christian Heritage, showed less enthusiasm. Later, a Christian Heritage Party convention rejected the proposal, although it did offer an alliance which would have seen the parties contest the election together. Lee, deeply disappointed at the rejection, refused the alliance. Van Rij also expressed disappointment with the decision.

On 17 May 1995, Lee re-launched his party, calling it the Christian Democrat Party. (The Christian Heritage Party complained to the Electoral Commission that the name too closely resembled their own, but the commission rejected thiscomplaint.). The launch of the party generated considerable attention in the media. Lee also received considerable publicity for his attacks on the "Death with Dignity" bill, an attempt by dissident National MP Michael Laws to legalise euthanasia.

The Christian Coalition 
Occasional attempts at talks between Christian Heritage and the Christian Democrats continued during the early part of 1995, but these proved generally ineffectual. Towards the end of 1995, however, pressure for a united front began to increase substantially. Bill van Rij became particularly prominent in this effort, as did a number of Christian associations which threatened to withhold their endorsement. At the instigation of Murray Smith, an Executive Member with Christian Democrats, more talks took place, and eventually decided an alliance possible, with everything split exactly equally between the two parties. The joint party list would alternate between the Christian Democrats and Christian Heritage, beginning with Lee (as a sitting MP) in first place and Capill in second. While the two parties would campaign together, they would function separately in Parliament.

The new Christian Coalition launched on 29 March 1996. It received considerable public attention, and prospered in opinion-polls. The coalition issued its manifesto in September, though — due to an inability to resolve certain differences between the two parties — the manifesto lacked a degree of detail. The Christian Heritage Party expressed a certain amount of dissatisfaction over the manifesto, which it considered "too moderate". Lee and the Christian Democrats, however, strongly believed moderation crucial to electoral success, and that Christian Heritage's more extreme policies would alienate many voters. Even with Lee's attempt at moderation, however, the party's more controversial views tended to receive the most media attention, and many criticised the coalition as "extremist".

In the 1996 election itself, the Christian Coalition gained 4.33% of the vote. This fell short of the 5% necessary for proportional representation under the Mixed Member Proportional (MMP) system, and none of the party's electorate candidates won a seat. As many polls had once shown the coalition as passing the 5% threshold, this result led to disappointment in some circles. Considerable acrimony ensued between Christian Heritage and the Christian Democrats, with both believing that the other had caused the loss. Christian Heritage generally believed that the Christian Democrats had "watered down" the coalition's message in the name of political pragmatism, surrendering the moral high ground and giving up the party's clear focus. The Christian Democrats, on the other hand, said that Christian Heritage's extremism and unwillingness to compromise had led to the defeat. Each side essentially blamed the other for dragging the coalition down.

In May 1997, the Christian Coalition dissolved, and its constituent parties went their separate ways. Shortly afterwards, Bill van Rij left Christian Heritage and joined the Christian Democrats, blaming Capill for the collapse of the Coalition. A number of other senior Christian Heritage members, led by a former Deputy Leader, Geoff Hounsell, also resigned; and the party expelled others. Ex-members joined the Christian Democrats following an unsuccessful attempt to have Christian Heritage agree to a merger with Christian Democrats.

After the Christian Coalition

Christian Heritage 
The Christian Heritage Party remained somewhat bitter about the collapse of the Christian Coalition. While considerable tension had existed between Christian Heritage and the Christian Democrats, Graham Capill apparently believed a resolution possible. After the Christian Democrats left, however, Christian Heritage re-affirmed all its traditional policies, including those that had seemed too extreme for the Coalition.

Christian Heritage stood Ewen McQueen as its candidate in the 1998 Taranaki-King Country byelection. McQueen out-polled candidates for the larger New Zealand First and Green parties.

Six months before the 1999 general election, Frank Grover, leader of the Liberal Party, a component of the Alliance, defected to Christian Heritage, giving it one seat in Parliament. Grover had won election as an Alliance list MP in 1996. High-profile broadcaster Philip Sherry also joined the party in 1999 and stood in the number 2 position on the party list. Christian Heritage gained 2.4% of the vote in the 1999 election, well short of the threshold for entering Parliament, although enough to make it easily the largest party outside parliament.

In the 2002 general election, Australian political consultant David Elliot, a prominent campaigner against republicanism in Australia, became the campaign manager for Christian Heritage. A strategy developed of focusing on a single electorate, Wairarapa, whereby Christian Heritage could gain entry to parliament and bypass the 5% requirement. However, the result proved disappointing – the party gained only 1.4% of the vote, and its Wairarapa candidate, deputy leader Merepeka Raukawa-Tait, came third. Christian Heritage's support defected to United Future New Zealand, a merger of Future New Zealand (a successor to the Christian Democrats) and Peter Dunne's United New Zealand, which had occurred in 2000.

In 2003, Capill stepped down as party leader and Ewen McQueen succeeded him. The party renamed itself Christian Heritage New Zealand (CHNZ).

In 2005 a court convicted former leader Capill for the repeated rape and sexual violation of a girl aged eight, and jailed him for nine years. The new Christian Heritage leadership condemned Capill's conduct.

On 3 October 2006, ex-CHNZ Leader Ewen McQueen announced that Christian Heritage would disband 
to allow "new things to arise in Christian politics in New Zealand". Former Christian Heritage Leader, Ewen McQueen announced that the hypothetical new party would "make a strong and clear stand for the importance of family life, the primacy of marriage and the sanctity of human life." McQueen later joined the New Zealand National Party and unsuccessfully stood for the nomination for the Epsom electorate in 2011.

 debate continued over whether Christian Heritage ever amounted to anything more than a "testimonial party". As noted above, this model of politics refers to a particular model of partisan 'politics of principle' that eschews pragmatic political objectives. If this is the case, then there are certain implications. As the Netherlands has a demographically based electoral system, this means that the testimonial party model could rely on Reformed fundamentalist constituencies in Zeeland, Veluwe and parts of Overijssel, the Dutch "Bible Belt." However, New Zealand's Mixed Member Proportional electoral system imposes a five percent threshold before a party that has no constituency seat representation can be represented within the New Zealand Parliament, as does its own German model. As CHNZ never cleared that threshold, it may therefore be seen as an imported 'testimonial party' model that did not work in a foreign political context or electoral system.

By contrast, United Future New Zealand worked that same electoral system well. However, Christian Heritage's constitution seemed to rule out Christian Heritage functioning as a purely "testimonial party". While it allowed as an objective of the party to "promote and uphold biblical principles", the constitution went on to state that the party had as a goal to "gain seats in parliament so that it can have a direct influence on legislation, policy, and the governing of New Zealand."

Christian Democrats, Future NZ, and the Kiwi Party 

The Christian Democrats, by contrast, took a considerably different path. Not long after the Christian Coalition fell apart, Graeme Lee announced that he would step down as leader of the party. He had contemplated retiring for some time, and had already determined that if the Coalition failed he would make his exit from politics. For some considerable period of time the party remained with Lee as temporary leader, as no satisfactory new candidate had emerged. Eventually Anthony Walton became its new leader. Under Walton, the Christian Democrats went further down the non-confessional path, removing all explicit references to Christianity from their party platform. The party adopted the name "Future New Zealand" (rejecting "Future Vision" as a proposed alternative), and positioned itself as a "values-based" rather than as a religion-based party.

Future New Zealand contested the 1999 general election but gained only 1.1% of the party vote. The party considered becoming an apolitical lobby-group, but led by its General Secretary, Murray Smith, who had instigated discussions with Peter Dunne, the leader of United New Zealand and the holder of a "safe" constituency seat, the party decided to explore a coalition with United New Zealand instead. Following further discussions with United, the two parties entered into a coalition to contest the 2002 general election under the name United Future New Zealand. The group gained 6.7% of the party vote, giving it eight seats. In 2003 the two parties merged. For a time there was debate as to whether to classify the resultant group as a Christian party, but the party's rejection of that label appears to have clarified matters. According to United Future, the party does indeed have a grounding in traditional values, but remains open to anyone who shares those values, not merely to Christians.

In the 2005 general election, United Future's support slump to 2.67%, leaving it with only three MPs. The precise reasons for this remain difficult to identify, but it appears that many former Christian supporters of United Future cast their votes for the National Party in the 2005 election.

In 2006–2007, Peter Dunne decided to vote in favour of a bill banning parental corporal punishment of children, while his surviving party caucus-members, Gordon Copeland and Judy Turner voted against it. As a result of Dunne's exercise of his right to a conscience vote over this issue, Gordon Copeland seceded from the United Future caucus. Copeland and former UFNZ List MP Larry Baldock announced their intention to re-form an independent Future New Zealand party (renamed the Kiwi Party on 25 January 2008). Baldock has said that over one hundred former UFNZ board members and candidates joined them. However, UFNZ President Denise Krum contested Baldock's assertion over resignations. According to its website, Future New Zealand enrolling the five hundred party-members required for registration under the Electoral Act 1993. It remains unclear whether these figures represent former disgruntled FNZ members who had quit after the merger with United, or new supporters, possibly from the disintegrated Christian Heritage New Zealand.

In the event, the 2008 general election was a disappointment for the Kiwi Party. They polled 11,658 votes in total, only 0.54% of the total party votes cast for all New Zealand political parties, and far short of the five-percent threshold required for list-only electoral representation. It even polled behind the avowedly satirical Bill and Ben Party.

On 14 October 2011 the Kiwi Party announced that it would not be standing any candidates in the 2011 general election, and that several members had joined the Conservative Party and would be standing for it. On 8 February 2012 the Kiwi Party was de-registered as a political party under the Electoral Act 1993, at its own request and was disbanded.

Destiny New Zealand (2005–2007) and the Family Party (2007–2010) 

In 2003 another Christian party was formed in New Zealand: Destiny New Zealand, based on the evangelical Destiny Church pastored by controversial figure Brian Tamaki. Bishop Tamaki claimed that Destiny would rule New Zealand by 2008, but in the 2005 general election the party only polled 0.6%, far short of the support required to enter Parliament. This was also far short of the over 2% support managed by the Christian Heritage Party in 1993 and 1999.

In April 2007, Brian Tamaki and Samoan-born evangelical Christian and independent former Labour Party MP for Mangere Taito Phillip Field held talks about a possible rapprochement between Destiny New Zealand and Field's fledgling "Pacific Party". However, Field was under police investigation for allegedly questionable financial dealings.

On 18 September 2007, Destiny New Zealand announced that it would de-register itself under the terms of the Electoral Act 1993 to allow the formation of a new composite evangelical/fundamentalist political party. This would have become an amalgam of Destiny New Zealand, Future New Zealand and Taito Phillip Field, if the latter survived the criminal investigations. Richard Lewis and Gordon Copeland would have become joint leaders of the new fundamentalist party. However, reports emerged that Copeland and Future New Zealand had refused to work with Lewis, and had sought to marginalise Brian Tamaki's influence in the proposed new party. This led to recriminations from the National Advisory Committee established to advance this process, including former UFNZ MP Paul Adams and a representative of Field.

Richard Lewis and Paul Adams became co-leaders of the Family Party, which hoped to harness Pacific Island immigrant evangelicals in Mangere, South Auckland, who traditionally vote for the Labour Party. Jerry Filipaina stood as their Mangere candidate in the 2008 general election, running against Taito Phillip Field who had formed the New Zealand Pacific Party. The Family Party's hopes proved futile, winning 999 votes in Mangere and coming fourth. Labour's William Sio retook the seat for his party from Taito Phillip Field by 7126 votes. Altogether, the Family Party accumulated only 8,176 (0.35%) of total party votes cast in New Zealand, and disbanded in 2010.

The New Zealand Pacific Party polled only 8640 (0.37 percent) of the total party votes cast, and did not win another anchoring constituency seat, it lacked representation in the 49th New Zealand Parliament. In September 2011, Taito Philip Field was found guilty of bribery and corruption charges and sentenced to six years imprisonment.

New Conservative Party (2011– )
The Conservative Party was founded in 2011 by property manager Colin Craig. Although it is not a religious or Christian party, it retains some Christian input. However, party CEO and Epsom candidate Christine Rankin is a Buddhist. The Conservative Party polled 2.65% of the vote in 2011. The party had a stronger showing in 2014, polling 3.97%.

In mid-2015, the Conservative Party imploded after the party's founder and main backer Colin Craig resigned following allegations of an inappropriate relationship towards his former press secretary Rachel MacGregor. The scandal led to the resignation of the party's entire board and caused the Conservatives' poll rankings to drop to 0.3% in the Newshub–Reid Research survey in September 2017. The scandal was complicated by infighting within the party between Craig and rival John Stringer and an exchange of lawsuits between Craig, fellow party member John Stringer, New Zealand Taxpayers' Union executive director Jordan Williams, and the right wing blogger Cameron Slater. Following the resignation of Craig, Leighton Baker was elected as the Conservative Party's new leader in September 2015.

During the 2017 general election, the Conservatives fielded 27 electoral candidates and 12 party list candidates. Despite the loss of Craig's financial resources, the party managed to rebuild some of its membership. Due to the party's low poll ratings, the Conservatives did not make the cut for the minor parties' debate and were only allocated $52,000 in broadcasting by the New Zealand Electoral Commission. The Conservatives performed poorly during the 2017 election, gaining only 0.2% of the party vote (6,253) and failing to win a seat in Parliament.

In November 2017, the Conservatives revamped themselves as the New Conservative Party. The party is currently led by Elliot Ikilei. Besides campaigning on free speech issues and conservative family values, the New Conservatives have advocated citizens' initiated referendums and opposed the United Nations' Global Compact for Migration, the decriminalisation of abortion and euthanasia.

At the New Zealand general election 2020, the New Conservatives managed to secure 35,594 votes. Although this was a significant improvement on its polling at the previous New Zealand election in 2017, its total voter share was 1.5%. This fell short of the five percent party list only threshold for representation within the New Zealand Parliament under New Zealand's Mixed Member Proportional electoral system. A fortnight after the election, Elliot Ikilei Pascoe was appointed the New Conservative Party leader, the third person to lead the party and the first Pacific Island person to lead a conservative Christian political party. However, on 19 November 2020, Ikilei resigned in his turn as party leader after forty days in the position. The New Conservative board has said it will not select another leader at present and will govern the party and make media releases. In October 2021, the party announced that it now had two 'co-leaders', Helen Houghton and Ted Johnston  While Houghton stood for the New Conservatives in the 2022 Tauranga constituency by-election and Johnston stood as candidate for the Auckland Mayoralty in 2022, neither won their contests or placed well

Vision New Zealand (2019– )
In 2019, a new Christian party called Vision New Zealand was launched under the leadership of Hannah Tamaki, the wife of Destiny Church leader Bishop Brian Tamaki. The party has so far received most attention for its anti-Muslim and anti-Asian views. It has advocated banning the construction of mosques, temples and other foreign buildings of worship, reducing immigration including refugees, and opposing the United Nations' Global Compact for Migration.

On 17 October 2020, the Vision New Zealand Party secured 2,775 votes at the New Zealand general election 2020. This comprised 0.2% of all votes cast during that election and fell significantly short of the five percent threshold for party list only representation under the Mixed Member Proportional electoral system which has existed in New Zealand since 1996.

ONE Party (2020– )

In June 2020, another Christian party called ONE Party was launched under the leadership of Stephanie Harawira and Edward Shanly. The ONE Party says that it wants to promote a Christian voice in Parliament. The party opposes any decriminalization of abortion, seeks to ban transgender medical and counselling treatments for people under the age of 18 years, and supports Israel.

At the 2020 election, the ONE Party received 6,470 party votes, or 0.3% of the total party votes, short of the five percent threshold for party list representation.

Māori Christianity 

The first significant specifically Christian political party activity in New Zealand came at the behest of the Ratana movement. The Ratana Church, established by Māori spiritual leader Tahupotiki Wiremu Ratana in 1925, gained particularly strong support from Māori of lower socio-economic status. The Ratana movement actively participated in the world of politics, and the first Ratana Member of Parliament gained election in a 1932 by-election.

In Parliament, the Ratana movement co-operated closely with the Labour Party, the rising force in New Zealand politics in the 1930s. In the 1935 elections, Ratana won two of the four of the Māori seats, and shortly afterwards, allied itself with the Labour Party, which had won the election. The Labour Party and the Ratana movement have remained closely allied since this point, although the alliance has grown strained at times, and both National and the Maori Party also vie for their support.

Piri Wiri Tua Movement
In  years at least one independent attempt has occurred to bring the Ratana religion to politics — the Piri Wiri Tua party, although not part of the Ratana Church, has strong roots in Ratanadom.

Christian political impact in New Zealand
Because New Zealand is now a predominantly secular society, conservative Christians have been unable to halt the removal of Christian hegemony over morality and ethical conduct. Abortion in New Zealand was decriminalised under the Abortion Legislation Act 2019, same-sex marriage in New Zealand has been recognised since 2013 and voluntary euthanasia in New Zealand has recently been decriminalised as well under the terms of a binding referendum which supported passage of the End of Life Choice Act 2020. However, Family First has claimed credit for the defeat of efforts to decriminalise cannabis during the 2020 New Zealand cannabis referendum.

Election results

See also
 Religion in New Zealand
 Family First New Zealand
 Politics of New Zealand
 Raven-Taylor-Hales Brethren (Exclusive Brethren)

References

Bibliography
 J.Cocker and J.Malton Murray (eds) Temperance and Prohibition in New Zealand: the New Zealand Alliance for Abolition of the Liquor Trade: [Electronic Resource]: 2005: 
 Allan Davidson: Christianity in Aotearoa: A History of Church and Society in New Zealand: Wellington: The New Zealand Education for Ministry Board: 2004. 
 Pauline Engel: The Abolition of Capital Punishment in New Zealand: Wellington: Department of Justice: 1977.
 Maureen Goring: "Lex Talionis and the Christian Churches: The Question of Capital Punishment in New Zealand" in James Veitch (ed) To Strive and Not to Yield: Essays in Honour of Colin Brown. Wellington: Department of Religious Studies: 1994: 
 A.K.Grigg: "Prohibition, the Church and Labour in New Zealand: 1890–1914" New Zealand Journal of History: Oct.1981: 15:2: 135–154.
 Bruce Jesson, Allanah Ryan, and Paul Spoonley: Revival of the Right: New Zealand Politics in the 1980s: Auckland: Heinemann Reed: 1988. 
 Brett Knowles: New Life: A History of the New Life Churches of New Zealand: 1942–1979: Dunedin: Third Millennium: 1999.  (This book has gone out of print. However, a hardback, footnoted, version remains available (under a different title) from Edwin Mellen Press, New York (:http://www.mellenpress.com/mellenpress.cfm?bookid=1533&pc=9). Details are:
 Brett Knowles: The History of a New Zealand Pentecostal Movement: The New Life Churches of New Zealand from 1946 to 1979: Lewiston, N.Y.: Edwin Mellen Press: 2000:
 Dirk Vanderpyl (ed) Trust and Obey: The Reformed Churches of New Zealand: 1953–1993: Silverstream: Reformed Publishing Company: 1994: 
 Joanne Wood: A Challenge Not A Truce: The History of the New Zealand Women's Christian Temperance Union: 1885–1985: Nelson: NZWCTU: 1986.

External links
Family First: NZ 'family values' lobby group
Nikolai Organisation Orthodox Christian activist group

Politics of New Zealand
New Zealand
Politics
Conservatism in New Zealand